The 1955 Virginia Cavaliers football team represented the University of Virginia during the 1955 college football season. The Cavaliers were led by third-year head coach Ned McDonald and played their home games at Scott Stadium in Charlottesville, Virginia. They competed as members of the Atlantic Coast Conference, their second year in the league, and the league's third year overall. Virginia once again failed to pick up their first ACC win, finishing winless in conference games. At the conclusion of a 1–9 campaign, McDonald resigned as head coach.

Schedule

References

Virginia
Virginia Cavaliers football seasons
Virginia Cavaliers football